Acaena inermis, the spineless acaena, is a species of flowering plant in the family Rosaceae, native to New Zealand and introduced to Great Britain. A mat-forming perennial useful as a ground cover, its cultivar 'Purpurea' is widely available from commercial suppliers.

References

inermis
Endemic flora of New Zealand
Garden plants of New Zealand
Flora of the North Island
Flora of the South Island
Plants described in 1852